OVF Alliance is a soccer club from Albany, Oregon competing in the Northwest Division of USL League Two. They will begin play in the 2021 USL League Two season.

The club was formed as a merger of TFA Willamette and Corvallis SC. TFA Willamette was originally set to join the league for the 2020 season, however, the season was canceled due to the COVID-19 pandemic.

Year-by-year

References

USL League Two teams
Association football clubs established in 2020
Soccer clubs in Oregon
Albany, Oregon
2020 establishments in Oregon